Icon is a greatest hits album by American country musician Vince Gill. It was released on August 31, 2010 by MCA Nashville, and contains select highlight songs from his career.

Track listing

Critical reception
Stephen Thomas Erlewine, in his review for Allmusic, says the album is "a very good sampler of Vince Gill's biggest hits for MCA Nashville".

Chart performance

References

2010 compilation albums
Vince Gill compilation albums
MCA Records compilation albums